Yaqoub Mohamed Al-Youha (born 31 January 1993) is a Kuwaiti sprint runner specialising in the high hurdles. He represented his country at the 2017 World Championships reaching the semifinals. He won silver medals at the Asian championships in 2014–2017.

His personal best in the 110 metres hurdles is 13.35 set in Doha in 2019. It is the current national record.

International competitions

1Disqualified in the final
2Did not finish in the semifinals

References

External links
 

1993 births
Living people
Kuwaiti male hurdlers
World Athletics Championships athletes for Kuwait
Athletes (track and field) at the 2014 Asian Games
Asian Games competitors for Kuwait
Athletes (track and field) at the 2020 Summer Olympics
Olympic athletes of Kuwait
Islamic Solidarity Games competitors for Kuwait
Islamic Solidarity Games medalists in athletics
20th-century Kuwaiti people
21st-century Kuwaiti people